The Union Cycliste Internationale (UCI), the governing body of cycling, categorises teams into three divisions. The top 18 teams are the UCI WorldTeams and compete in the UCI World Tour. The second and third divisions respectively are the Professional Continental teams and the Continental teams.

The teams compete in the UCI Continental Circuits, which are divided into five continental zones: Africa, America, Asia, Europe and Oceania. They also win points in the UCI World Ranking. Professional Continental teams are also invited to participate in events in the UCI World Tour, although they are not eligible to win points in the World Tour rankings.

List of 2017 UCI Professional Continental teams 
According to the UCI Rulebook,

"a professional continental team is an organisation created to take part in road events open to professional continental teams. It is known by a unique name and registered with the UCI in accordance with the provisions below.
 The professional continental team comprises all the riders registered with the UCI as members of the team, the paying agent, the sponsors and all other persons contracted by the paying agent and/or the sponsors to provide for the continuing operation of the team (manager, team manager, coach, paramedical assistant, mechanic, etc.).
 Each professional continental team must employ at least 14 riders, 2 team managers and 3 other staff (paramedical assistants, mechanics, etc.) on a full time basis for the whole registration year."

UCI Continental teams 
According to the UCI Rulebook, "a UCI continental team is a team of road riders recognised and licensed to take part in events on the continental calendars by the national federation of the nationality of the majority of its riders and registered with the UCI. The precise structure (legal and financial status, registration, guarantees, standard contract, etc.) of these teams shall be determined by the regulations of the national federation."

2017 UCI Africa Tour teams

2017 UCI America Tour teams

2017 UCI Asia Tour teams

2017 UCI Europe Tour teams

2017 UCI Oceania Tour teams

References 

2017 in men's road cycling
2017